Love On Love is a 1992 song by English electronic music group E-Zee Possee featuring Dr. Mouthquake. It peaked at number 59 on the UK Singles Chart and number 30 on the US Billboard Dance Music/Club Play Singles chart.

Critical reception
Bill Coleman from Billboard noted that "this hot R&B-inflected number brims with crossover potential. Great song, performance, and mix." Ernest Hardy from Cashbox wrote, "Though it's been out for a little while, I'm listening a great deal to this single. When I first heard it some time ago at a party, I thought someone had dug up some old, vaulted Sylvester tune, given it a House mix, and created a masterpiece. Though Sylvester had nothing to do with it, this "positive vibe" track is still one of the best things I've heard all year, with a great piano break in the mix, and soaring, heart-felt vocals. Find this."

Charts

References

1989 singles
1989 songs
E-Zee Possee songs
Songs written by Jeremy Healy
Songs written by Simon Rogers
Songs written by Boy George